The German Archaeological Institute (DAI) is a research institute in the field of archaeology (and other related fields). The DAI is a "federal agency" under the Federal Foreign Office of Germany.

History

Eduard Gerhard founded the institute. Upon his departure from Rome in 1832, the headquarters of the Instituto di corrispondenza archeologica, as it was then named, was established in Berlin. Its predecessor institute was founded there by Otto Magnus von Stackelberg, Theodor Panofka and August Kestner in 1829.

Hans-Joachim Gehrke was president of the institute from March 2008 to April 2011,  and has been succeeded by Friederike Fless.

Facilities 
The DAI currently has offices in cities including Madrid, Rome, Istanbul, Athens, Cairo, Damascus, Baghdad, Tehran and Sana'a.

The DAI's Romano-Germanic Commission (Römisch-Germanische Kommission) includes the world's largest library for prehistoric archaeology and is located in Frankfurt. Its commission for the History of Classical Antiquity is in Munich and its Commission for the Archaeology of Non-European Cultures is located in Bonn.

Notable members
 Klaus Schmidt, German archaeologist and pre-historian who led the excavations at Göbekli Tepe from 1996 to 2014
 Eszter Bánffy, Hungarian prehistorian and archaeologist
 Yevhen Chernenko, Ukrainian archaeologist
 Elisabeth Ettlinger, Swiss archaeologist of the Roman provinces
 D. E. L. Haynes, English classical scholar, archaeologist and museum curator
 Nikolaos Kaltsas, Greek classical archaeologist
 Jürgen Oldenstein, German archaeologist of the Roman provinces
Emmanouil Korres, Greek restoration architect and archaeologist

See also
German Historical Institute
German Archaeological Institute at Athens
Projekt Dyabola
Arachne (archaeological database)

References

 
Research institutes in Germany
Archaeological research institutes
Educational institutions established in 1832
1832 establishments in Germany
Scientific organizations established in the 1830s